The 36th People's Choice Awards, honoring the best in popular culture for 2009, was held on January 6, 2010, at the Nokia Theatre in Los Angeles, California, and was broadcast on CBS.  Not all of the awards were presented on air during  the show, as many including Favorite Movie were left out. As well as Favorite Actor, Johnny Depp also won the Actor/Actress of the Decade award.

Performers
Mary J. Blige
Cobra Starship (duet with Nicole Scherzinger)

Nominees
Winners are listed in bold.

Presenters
Ellen DeGeneres
Rascal Flatts
Kate Walsh
Sofia Vergara
James Denton
Chevy Chase
Christian Slater
Jenna Elfman
Kellan Lutz
Paula Patton
will.i.am
George Lopez
Jackie Chan
Queen Latifah
Josh Holloway
Ginnifer Goodwin
Demi Lovato
Colbie Caillat
Jessica Alba
Kathryn Morris
LL Cool J
Greg Grunberg
Taraji P. Henson
Sacha Baron Cohen
Katie Cassidy

References

People's Choice Awards
2009 awards in the United States
2010 in American television
2010 in California